Daniel Hecht is the name of:
 Daniel Hecht, American novelist
 Danny Hecht, fictional character in Alias TV show
 Daniel Friedrich Hecht, mathematician